Black Tooth Mountain is located in the Bighorn Mountains in the U.S. state of Wyoming. The peak is the second highest in the range after Cloud Peak, which is only  to the south, and the summit is located in the Cloud Peak Wilderness of Bighorn National Forest. The sharp dark profile of the mountain resembles a dark tooth or fang, hence the name. Because of the steep terrain, Black Tooth Mountain is one of the hardest mountains to climb in the Bighorns. Many of the trails up the mountain are unmarked which adds to the difficulty of reaching the summit. Mount Woolsey is an adjacent summit only  to the southeast. Another high peak of the Bighorns known as Hallelujah Peak is situated along a knife-like ridge known as an arête  to the northeast. Several tiny remnant glaciers can be found on the north slopes of Black Tooth Mountain.

References

Mountains of Big Horn County, Wyoming
Mountains of Johnson County, Wyoming
Mountains of Wyoming
Bighorn National Forest